Ernő Egri Erbstein, also known as Ernest and Ernesto Erbstein (13 May 18984 May 1949), was a Hungarian football player and manager. He carried out his footballing activities in several countries, and was most noted for his association with Italian football.

Biography

Erbstein carried out the majority of his playing career with Budapesti AK, with whom he spent almost a decade, either side of a brief spell with Hakoah Arad in 1922. After first getting a taste for Italian football with Olympia Fiume (Fiume was the Italian name for the present-day Croatian city of Rijeka) he moved to Vicenza for a season.

As a manager Bari gave him his first chance, but his forward thinking tactics were ineffective with the group of players at that time, but the fast flowing attractive football caught the eye of the Italian public despite Bari's relegation which saw him relieved of his duties. Short spells at Nocerina, Cagliari and Bari again before moving on to Lucchese where he spent five years gaining promotion to 'Serie A' during this period. Erbstein moved to Torino after that, but because of World War II and the fact that he was Jewish meant that the implementation of the 'Manifesto of Race' which stripped Jewish people of their right to work. Despite these restrictions, he continued to offer his advice through an unofficial role, before leaving Italy and returned to Hungary when it became too unsafe to remain.

He was sent to a Nazi forced labor camp near Budapest. He escaped in December 1944, just before he was about to be sent to Auschwitz concentration camp, together with Béla Guttmann, another famous Jewish-Hungarian player and coach.

After the war Erbstein rejoined Torino, this time in the capacity of a trainer; this was one of the most noted spells in Italian football where they secured the Serie A title. During this successful period, this Torino side became known as Grande Torino. Erbstein (as technical director) along with Englishman Leslie Lievesley (as trainer) were co-managers during the 1948–49 season. Torino were defending champions of Italy and on track to progress further. Disaster struck on 4 May 1949 when Erbstein and the majority of the Torino team died in the Superga air disaster.

Honours

Technical director
Torino
Serie A: 1947–48

Manager
Lucchese
Serie B: 1935–36
Torino
Serie A: 1948–49

Individual
Torino F.C. Hall of Fame: 2019

References

1898 births
1949 deaths
Romanian people of Hungarian-Jewish descent
Hungarian footballers
Jewish footballers
U.S. Fiumana players
HNK Rijeka players
L.R. Vicenza players
Hungarian football managers
S.S.C. Bari managers
Expatriate footballers in Italy
Expatriate football managers in Italy
Jewish escapees from Nazi concentration camps
Association football wing halves
Victims of the Superga air disaster